Go Hui-dong (1886–1965), also known by the pen name Chun-gok, born in Seoul, was the first Korean painter to adopt Western styles.  He spent most of his life in Seoul.  He studied French there from 1899 to 1903 and briefly took a post with the Korean government.  Leaving the post in 1905, he studied Korean painting for several years and then traveled to Japan, where he studied Western-style painting under Kuroda Seiki from 1909 to 1915.  He returned to Korea in 1915 and sought to fuse traditional and Korean styles. Currently his house located in Bukchon Village is open to public.

References

External links 
 Artnet profile

20th-century Korean painters
Modern painters
1886 births
1965 deaths